Burrower may refer to:

 Burrowing animals, any animals that excavate burrows
 Sandburrowers, a family of fishes
 The Burrowers, a 2008 film

See also 
 Burrower bugs, a family of insects
 Snout-burrowers, or shovelnose frogs